Karakuyu means "black well" in Turkic languages and may refer to:

 Karakuyu, Aksaray, village in Aksaray Province, Turkey
 Karakuyu, Dinar, village in Afyonkarahisar Province, Turkey
 Karakuyu, Emirdağ, village in Afyonkarahisar Province, Turkey
 Karakuyu, Karaisalı, village in Adana Province, Turkey
 Karakuyu, Korkuteli, village in Antalya Province, Turkey
 Karakuyu, Polatlı, village in Ankara Province, Turkey
 Karakuyu, Saimbeyli, village in Adana Province, Turkey
 Karakuyu, Seyhan, village in Adana Province, Turkey